Ryan Martinie (born August 6, 1975) is an American musician, best known as the bassist for heavy metal band Mudvayne.

Early life
Ryan Martinie was born on August 6, 1975, in Peoria, Illinois.

Career

Mudvayne
In 1996, Mudvayne was formed. They initially had a different bass player, Shawn Allen (Barclay was a joke name for insiders). In 1997, still with Shawn as their bass player, Mudvayne released their first EP, Kill, I Oughta. The band released five studio albums in their career, and remained active until 2010 when they went on an indefinite hiatus. Mudvayne announced in April 2021 that they were reuniting for their first shows in more than a decade and possibly new music.

Other projects
Martinie was the guest bassist on Kurai, a project created by guitarist and vocalist Scott Von Heldt. The drummer was Abel Vallejo, the drum tech for Korn. The group released their debut EP, Breaking the Broken on December 17, 2013.

In 2015, Martinie began playing with a jazz fusion / progressive rock trio Soften the Glare. They recorded their first album Making Faces which was released on September 1, 2017.

Martinie has a "not yet defined" side project that he intends to materialize, saying "People are going to have to see my ugly mug again whether you want to or not... There is a lot going on it's just whether these things end up being Mudvayne things or other things I'm not going to worry about what ends up being what or where it goes". He said that his playing style will differ from that which was heard in Mudvayne. On August 2, 2012, Korn announced that Ryan Martinie will join them on their European tour that kicked off in Poland, as the band's bassist Fieldy and his wife were expecting a child. He starred in the meme "Most Brutal Death Metal Scream (year)" and later became popular for the "brbr deng" meme.

Musical style
Martinie is known for pushing the envelope that most metal bassists limit themselves to. His right hand is one of the major reasons for this, as he pulls from many different techniques and genres. He is known for flicks (found throughout his music) and a flamenco style, notable on "Dull Boy" and the chorus of "Out To Pasture" in some way. On the chorus of "Out To Pasture", he does a "fast flamenco guitar-picking pattern that's as fast as my hand can possibly play. It's just this [extremely] fast pattern, and it's a sleeper, because it sounds like I'm playing single-notes almost, or chords, like I'm strumming chords, but really what's going on there is something completely different. It's the only thing you didn't mention, which makes me really proud, because it's supposed to be transparent, which is maybe one of the most important things that has come to me – in playing and in relating to the other instruments and in particular my band." He has a unique heavy fingering technique from which he gets the percussive tone and the sharper, more extreme attack from his bass. He also uses slapping and popping techniques on the most of the L.D. 50 album, most notably on the songs like "Dig". Martinie has developed his own tapping technique on the neck where he uses his index and middle fingers to tap an octave chord, usually high on the neck, while his left hand moves notes, doublestops or chords. This is very similar to a technique used by the Who's John Entwistle. On the album Mudvayne, he also plays complex bass parts in the intros of "Beautiful And Strange" and "I Can't Wait".

Personal life 
Not much is known about Martinie's personal life. He resides in Danville, Virginia. Martinie is known as a passionate reader. Some of his favorite musical artists include the Beatles, John Patitucci, Chick Corea, King Crimson, Death, Meshuggah, and Mastodon.

Equipment

Basses 
 1x Warwick Thumb NT Fretless Custom Shop Masterbuilt 5-string. He has used this bass with Soften the Glare, and it can be seen in their music video for "March of the Cephalopods". 
 1x Warwick Vampyre 4-string, which he was advertising back in 2003, but he always preferred his Thumb basses, so he was never actually seen with this bass. Ryan used this bass in the music video for "Happy".
 In 2021, Martinie teamed up with Fodera and released a signature model named "Blondie".

Amplification 
Martinie primarily used Ampeg SVT Pro amplifiers until The New Game was released, at which time he switched to Warwick amplification. He currently uses the Warwick Xtreme 10.1 Amp Head and four Warwick WCA 411 Pro cabinets. He is also known for slaving Greg Tribbett's guitar cabinets during live shows.

Discography

Mudvayne

Studio albums

 L.D. 50 (2000)
 The End of All Things to Come (2002)
 Lost and Found (2005)
 The New Game (2008)
 Mudvayne (2009)

Kurai
 Breaking the Broken (2013)

Soften the Glare
 Making Faces (2017)
 Glint (2020)

References

External links
http://modernrocklyric.blogspot.com/2009/05/ryan-martinie-with-warwick.html

American heavy metal bass guitarists
American male bass guitarists
Mudvayne members
1975 births
Musicians from Peoria, Illinois
American people of French descent
Living people
Progressive metal bass guitarists
Guitarists from Illinois
Alternative metal bass guitarists
People from Mebane, North Carolina
21st-century American bass guitarists